Wegahta Gebreyohannes Abera is an Ethiopian humanitarian worker and founder of Hdrina a nonprofit organization working to eradicate malnutrition in the war-torn Tigray region of Ethiopia. She was named in the BBC hundred women in 2022.

Humanitarian work 
Abera founded Hdrina to tackle malnutrition and other social issues caused by the armed conflict in Tigray region. The organization implements several programs including emergency feeding in internally displaced persons (IDP) camps and runs women empowerment programme training women in urban gardening. Her programme also includes helping victims of sexual violence perpetrated during the war and those pushed to commercial sex work resulting from poverty caused by the conflict.

References

Ethiopian women
Ethiopian philanthropists
Ethiopian humanitarians
Year of birth missing (living people)
Living people